Sokoch is a rural locality in the Yelizovsky District of Kamchatka Krai in Far Eastern Russia. The settlement was established in 1947 at the confluence of the rivers Plotnikova and Sokoch. In 2010 it had a population of 903 people. The river Sokoch is noted for its salmon.

References

Rural localities in Kamchatka Krai